In mathematics, specifically linear algebra, a real matrix A is copositive if

for every nonnegative vector .  The collection of all copositive matrices is a proper cone; it includes as a subset the collection of real positive-definite matrices.

Copositive matrices find applications in economics, operations research, and statistics.

References

Copositive matrix at PlanetMath

Matrices
Convex analysis